This is a list of the operas of the Italian composer Franco Alfano (1876–1954).

List

Sources
John C.G. Waterhouse, Alfano, Franco, in New Grove Dictionary of Music and Musicians, 2001
Alberto Pironti, Alfano, Franco in Dizionario Biografico degli Italiani, Volume 2 (1960)

Lists of operas by composer
Lists of compositions by composer